Pakistan Navy (Amendment) Act, 2020 seeks to amend the Pakistan Navy Act. It provides a measure to President of Pakistan acting on advice of Prime Minister of Pakistan to extend the tenure of Chief of Naval Staff (CONS) by three years. The amendment also bars the act of the extension of tenure from being challenged in any court. The act sets an upper age limit of 64 years for CONS.

References

Pakistan Navy
Acts of the Parliament of Pakistan
2020 in Pakistan
Military law
Imran Khan administration